Ramón de Esparza (fl. 1390) was a Basque nobleman, Knight and Lord of the palace Esparza.

Biography 

Ramón was born in Navarra, the son of Rodrigo de Esparza, belonging to the Basque nobility. He and his father had been vassals of Charles III of Navarre, and both attended the coronation of the King, occurred on February 13, 1390, in the Cathedral of Santa María.

Ramón de Esparza had an active participation during the Hundred Years' War, serving as Captain of the Garrison of Charles III in Cherbourg, Lower Normandy. In 1378, Esparza sent an emissary to England, to request help against the French army of Charles V of France.

References

External links 
archive.org - Diccionario de antigüedades del Reino de Navarra

14th-century nobility from the Kingdom of Navarre
15th-century nobility from the Kingdom of Navarre